The 2020–21 Montana Grizzlies men's basketball team represented the University of Montana in the 2020–21 NCAA Division I men's basketball season. The Grizzlies, led by seventh-year head coach Travis DeCuire, played their home games at Dahlberg Arena in Missoula, Montana as members of the Big Sky Conference. In a season limited due to the ongoing COVID-19 pandemic, the Grizzlies finished the season 15–3, 7–9 in Big Sky play to finish in sixth place. They defeated Idaho and Weber State in the Big Sky tournament before losing to Eastern Washington in the semifinals.

Previous season
The Grizzlies finished the 2019–20 season 18–13, 14–6 in Big Sky play to finish in third place. They were scheduled to play Idaho State in the quarterfinals of the Big Sky tournament, but due to the ongoing COVID-19 pandemic, all postseason tournaments were canceled, including the remainder of the Big Sky tournament.

Offseason

Departures

Incoming transfers

2020 recruiting class

Roster

Schedule and results 

|-
!colspan=12 style=| Regular season

|-
!colspan=12 style=| Big Sky tournament
|-

|-

Source

References

Montana Grizzlies basketball seasons
Montana Grizzlies
Montana Grizzlies basketball
Montana Grizzlies basketball